The Tito Escort Battalion was the protection unit of the Supreme Headquarters of Yugoslav Partisans and their commander Josip Broz Tito, responsible for their safety during World War II in Yugoslavia. It accompanied Tito throughout Yugoslavia during the war, suffering significant casualties and fighting pitched battles at times. Its most notable engagements were during the Axis Case Black offensive in south–eastern Bosnia in mid–1943, and in holding off the airborne assault of the German 500th SS Parachute Battalion during Operation Rösselsprung in mid–1944.

Notes

References

Books

Journals
 
 
 
 

Battalions of the Yugoslav Partisans
Infantry battalions
Josip Broz Tito
Military units and formations established in 1941
Yugoslav Resistance